Rayford Barnes (October 23, 1920 – November 11, 2000) was an American film and TV character actor from Whitesboro, Texas.

Early years
Barnes was born in Dallas, Texas, and attended the University of Texas. He acted in plays at the university and at little theaters in Dallas and San Antonio. After he moved to Oakland, California, he performed at the Pasadena Community Playhouse.

He had a younger brother, Lou Dupont, who was also an entertainer.

During World War II, Barnes served  years in the Navy, working as a navigator.

Career 
Barnes worked as a disc jockey at radio stations KTSA and WOAI.

After his military service, Barnes was a stagehand at three theaters in the San Francisco area, and he developed "a healthy respect for all the items actors depend upon for support ..."

In 1950, Barnes gained membership in Actors Equity and began to act on stage in Repertory Theater productions, including Three's a Family and Hasty Heart. He also worked off-stage there, creating staging and scenes for two other plays.

Barnes appeared in films, mainly westerns, such as Hondo, The Burning Hills, Fort Massacre, The Wild Bunch, The Hunting Party, and Cahill U.S. Marshal. He also appeared in the 1955 comedy Bowery to Bagdad.

Barnes also appeared on dozens of TV series most notably The Life and Legend of Wyatt Earp in which he portrayed Ike Clanton. Other series he appeared on include Father Knows Best, Bat Masterson, Highway Patrol, Racket Squad, The Untouchables, Cheyenne, Maverick, Have Gun - Will Travel, Cannon (episode "Call Unicorn), The Twilight Zone (episode "A Quality of Mercy", with Albert Salmi and Ralph Votrian), The Big Valley, Daniel Boone, The High Chaparral, Bonanza, Gunsmoke, Rawhide, Wonder Woman, Little House on the Prairie, Fantasy Island, The Dukes of Hazzard, and Walker, Texas Ranger. His final role was on the NBC medical drama ER in 1996.

Personal life 
In 1950, Barnes married Betty, and the next year they had a son.

Barnes lived in Manhattan Beach, California, with his long-time companion, Debbie. He often spoke about his movie making experiences with John Wayne, for whom he had great admiration.

Death 
Barnes died in Santa Monica or Manhattan Beach, California, on November 11, 2000, at age 80.

Selected filmography

Thunderbirds (1952) – Sgt. Case (uncredited)
The Stranger Wore a Gun (1953) – Raider Todd / Townsman (uncredited)
Hondo (1953) – Pete – Card Player in Saloon
Red River Shore (1953) – Pete – Henchman (uncredited)
The Desperado (1954) – Ray Novak
Return from the Sea (1954) – Radioman (uncredited)
Drum Beat (1954) – Captain Summer (uncredited)
Bowery to Bagdad (1955) – Canarsie
Battle Cry (1955) – Marine Aide on Command Ship Off Saipan (uncredited)
Seven Angry Men (1955) – William Doyle (uncredited)
Wichita (1955) – Hal Clements (uncredited)
The Revolt of Mamie Stover (1956) – Soldier (uncredited)
Behind the High Wall (1956) – George Miller
The Burning Hills (1956) – Veach
The Young Guns (1956) – Kid Cutler
Stagecoach to Fury (1956) – Zick
Beginning of the End (1957) – Chuck – National Guard Corporal
Gun Glory (1957) – Blondie (uncredited)
The Invisible Boy (1957) – Capt. McLaren (uncredited)
Fort Massacre (1958) – Moss
The Man Who Died Twice (1958) – Police Technician (uncredited)
Ride a Crooked Trail (1958) – Teeler Gang Member (uncredited)
Tombstone Territory (1958) – Laredo Markham
Lone Texan (1959) – Finch
The Gunfight at Dodge City (1959) – Corporal (uncredited)
Never So Few (1959) – Soldier in Helicopter (uncredited)
13 Fighting Men (1960) – Sgt. Yates
Bells Are Ringing (1960) – Bookie (uncredited)
Young Jesse James (1960) – Pitts
North to Alaska (1960) – Gold Buyer (uncredited)
Cimarron (1960) – Cavalry Sergeant Who Breaks Up Fight (uncredited)
Bat Masterson (1961) – Ed Twister
The Three Stooges in Orbit (1962) – Zogg / Airline Co-Pilot
Gunsmoke (1962) – Lee
Sunday in New York (1963) – Pilot Morgan (uncredited)
Guns of Diablo (1965) – Dan Macklin
Shenandoah (1965) – Horace – Rebel Deserter (uncredited)
Jesse James Meets Frankenstein's Daughter (1966) – Lonny Curry
The Wild Bunch (1969) – Buck
Kelly's Heroes (1970) - Soldier Hauling Maitland's Yacht (uncredited)
The Hunting Party (1971) – Crimp
Conquest of the Planet of the Apes (1972) – Riot Control Commander in Plaza (uncredited)
Little Cigars (1973) – Gus
Cahill U.S. Marshal (1973) – Pee Wee Simser
Mitchell (1975) – Det. Tyzack
Breakheart Pass (1975) – Sgt. Bellew
Invisible Strangler (1978) – Sgt. Archer
The Magic of Lassie (1978) – Reward Seeker
The Dukes of Hazzard (1979–1985, TV Series) – U.S. Marshal Ken Collins
Death Hunt (1981) – Trapper #3

References

External links
 

1920 births
2000 deaths
20th-century American male actors
American male film actors
American male television actors
Male actors from Texas
People from Whitesboro, Texas
Western (genre) television actors
University of Texas alumni